Frank Ochberg (born 1940), is a psychiatrist, a pioneer in trauma science, an educator and the editor of the first text on the treatment of post-traumatic stress disorder (PTSD). He is one of the founding fathers of modern psychotraumatology and served on the committee that defined PTSD. He is a graduate of Harvard and of Johns Hopkins Medical School.

Ochberg is a Clinical Professor of Psychiatry at Michigan State University, where he has also taught in the College of Human Medicine, College of Osteopathic Medicine, and the Schools of Journalism and Criminal Justice.

Ochberg has recently devoted much of his time to educating journalists about trauma, and, in recognition, the Dart Center's Ochberg Fellowship was named for him.  Ochberg Fellows, like Pulitzer Prize-winning writers, must demonstrate exceptional writing skills as well as thorough investigation of their topics.

He is a graduate of Harvard University and Johns Hopkins University medical school. From 1969 to 1979 he was a regional, division, and associate director of the National Institute of Mental Health.  He then became director of the Michigan Department of Mental Health, a position he held for 3 years, from 1979 to 1981.

Ochberg had created a therapeutic treatment, the counting method, also known as Ochberg's counting method, designed to help with the desensitization of posttraumatic stress disorder (PTSD) symptoms.

He had also founded, headed or been part of a number of organizations dealing with PTSD and its treatment, including Gift From Within (founder), Critical Incident Analysis Group (founder) and The Dart Center for Journalism and Trauma (chairman emeritus).

Personal life
Ochberg attended Camp Rising Sun in 1955 and 1956.

Ochberg has 3 children with Lynn Ochberg, his wife of almost 60 years.  They live in Okemos, Michigan, near Michigan State University, where Ochberg has taught in the College of Human Medicine and the Schools of Journalism and Criminal Justice.

Books edited 
 Violence and the Struggle for Existence (with Daniels and Gilula), editor (1970, Little Brown and Company)
 Victims of Terrorism (with Soskis), editor (1982, Westview Press)
 Post-traumatic Therapy and Victims of Violence, editor (1988, Brunner Mazel)
 Survivor Psalm

Interviews 
 Interview for Gift From Within on psychotherapy for chronic PTSD, November 2012
 Mental Help Net's Wise Counsel Podcast featured an interview with Dr. Ochberg on October 1, 2008

See also
Robert D. Hare
Symptoms of victimization
Counting method

References

External links 
 Gift From Within
 His Post-traumatic Therapy Outline
 http://www.dartcenter.org/fellowships

Traumatologists
1940 births
Living people
Harvard University alumni
Johns Hopkins School of Medicine alumni
Camp Rising Sun alumni